Day26 is the debut studio album by American R&B group Day26. It was released by Bad Boy Records and Atlantic Records on March 25, 2008.

Chart performance
Day26 debuted at number one on the US Billboard 200, with first week sales of about 190,000 copies, making it the third number one album from Making The Band winners. The album also debuted at the top of Top R&B/Hip-Hop Albums and Top Comprehensive Albums charts. As of October 11, 2008, the album has re-entered at number 192 on the Billboard 200 in the US. Day26 landed at number 119 on the year end Billboard 2008.

Singles
The first single is "Exclusive (No Excuses)". The song was only released as a digital promo-only single. The second single is "Got Me Going", which peaked at number seventy-nine on the Billboard Hot 100. The third single is "Since You've Been Gone".

Track listing

Notes
 denotes co-producer
 denotes additional producer

Charts

Weekly charts

Year-end charts

References

2008 debut albums
Day26 albums
Bad Boy Records albums
Albums produced by Bryan-Michael Cox
Albums produced by Danja (record producer)
Albums produced by the Runners
Albums produced by Sean Combs
Albums produced by L.T. Hutton